The Bagdad Mine is a large copper mine located in Arizona, in the southwestern part of the United States. Bagdad represents one of the largest copper reserves in the United States and in the world, having estimated reserves of 873.6 million tonnes of ore grading 0.36% copper. It is located in Yavapai County, Arizona, just west of the company town of Bagdad. It is owned by Freeport-McMoRan. Copper is produced from chalcopyrite and molybdenum from molybdenite. Copper oxides include chrysocolla, malachite and azurite. The mine's concentrator has a capacity of 75,000 metric tons per day using stockpile leaching, with pressure leaching for molybdenum.

Copper was first mined at the site in 1882. The town of Bagdad, Arizona was built as a company town to house mine workers.

In 2016, copper production at Bagdad amounted to 177 million pounds. In 2017, copper production amounted to 173 million pounds and nearly 900 people were employed there.

References

External links
 Bagdad Mine at Freeport McMoRan website

Copper mines in Arizona
Geography of Yavapai County, Arizona
Freeport-McMoRan mines
1882 establishments in Arizona Territory